The Suzuka 500 km, was the second round of the 1988 All Japan Sports Prototype Championship  was held at the Suzuka Circuit, on 10 April, in front of a crowd of approximately 24,000.

Report

Entry
A total of 26 cars were entered for the event, across three classes ranging from Local Prototypes to Group C Prototypes.

Qualifying
The pairing of Vern Schuppan and George Fouché took pole position for Trust Racing Team, in their Porsche 962GTi ahead of the European partnership of Kenny Acheson and Emanuele Pirro for the Omron Racing Team, in their Porsche 962C, by over 1.06secs.

Race
The race was held over 86 laps of the Suzuka circuit, a distance of 500 km (actual distance was 503.911 km). Eje Elgh and Maurizio Sandro Sala took the winner spoils for the Rothmans Porsche Schuppan Team, driving their Porsche 962C. The pair won in a time of 2hr 59:12.876mins., averaging a speed of 93.726 mph. Second place went to Vern Schuppan and George Fouché in the Trust Racing Team’s Porsche 962GTi who finished about 20seconds adrift. Also, the lead lap, was the third placed Porsche 962CK6 of Kris Nissen and Harald Grohs.

Classification

500km Suzuka

Class Winners are in Bold text.

 Fastest lap: Hideki Okada/Stanley Dickens, 1:56.691secs. (112.98 mph)

References

All Japan Sports Prototype Championship
International Suzuka 500km
Suzuka